Potassium benzoate (E212), the potassium salt of benzoic acid, is a food preservative that inhibits the growth of mold, yeast and some bacteria. It works best in low-pH products, below 4.5, where it exists as benzoic acid. 

Acidic foods and beverages such as fruit juice (citric acid), sparkling drinks (carbonic acid), soft drinks (phosphoric acid), and pickles (vinegar) may be preserved with potassium benzoate. It is approved for use in most countries including Canada, the United States and the European Union, where it is designated by the E number E212.

Potassium benzoate is also used in the whistle in many fireworks.

Synthesis
One very common way to make potassium benzoate is by oxidizing toluene to benzoic acid followed by a neutralization with potassium hydroxide. Another way to synthesize potassium benzoate in the lab setting is by hydrolyzing methyl benzoate with potassium hydroxide.

Mechanism of food preservation
The mechanism of food preservation begins with the absorption of benzoic acid into the cell. If the intracellular pH changes to 5 or lower, the anaerobic fermentation of glucose through phosphofructokinase is decreased by 95%.

Safety and health 
Potassium benzoate has low acute toxicity upon oral and dermal exposure.  The Food Commission, which campaigns for safer, healthier food in the UK, describes potassium benzoate as "mildly irritant to the skin, eyes and mucous membranes". 

Cats have a significantly lower tolerance to benzoic acid and its salts than rats and mice.

Under certain circumstances, such as in the presence of ascorbic acid, benzoate salts can produce benzene in soft drinks. The US Food and Drug Administration states the levels of benzene measured do not pose a safety concern for consumers.

Spectra

Carbon-13 NMR 
The carbon-13 NMR shows 5 unique peaks.  There are four peaks between 130-140 ppm from the carbon atoms in the benzene ring.  There is an additional carbon peak around 178 ppm representing the carbon atom from the carbonyl group.

Infrared spectrum 
The following are the main peaks in the IR spectrum.
 1610: C=O from carbonyl
 1580: C=C from benzene ring

See also 
 Sodium benzoate

References

Benzoates
Potassium compounds
Preservatives
Food additives
E-number additives